Miss World USA 1970 was the 9th edition of the Miss World USA pageant and it was held in Kings Castle in Lake Tahoe, Nevada and was won by Sandra Wolsfeld of Illinois. She was crowned by outgoing titleholder, Connie Lee Haggard of Texas. Wolsfeld went on to represent the United States at the Miss World 1970 Pageant in London later that year. She finished in the Top 15 at Miss World.

Results

Placements

Special awards

Delegates
The Miss World USA 1970 delegates were:

 Alabama - La Tanya V. Jones
 Alaska - Billie Bell
 Arizona - Jolene Johnson
 Arkansas - Linda Barela
 California - Seelchen Sund
 Colorado - Janice Robin Zito
 Connecticut - Darlene S. Muscarella
 Delaware - Royette Michelle Tarry
 District of Columbia - Marianne Burnette
 Florida - Gloria Dee Campbell
 Georgia - Katherine Long Johnson
 Idaho - Chris Hansen
 Illinois - Sandra "Sandie" Anne Wolsfeld 
 Iowa - Jacqueline Lee Jochims
 Kentucky - Lisa V. Schneiter
 Louisiana - Seletha A. Jarreau
 Maine - Margaret Aletha McAleer
 Maryland - Carlotta V. Moore
 Massachusetts - Deborah Ann Kennedy
 Michigan - Sally Ann Stretton
 Minnesota - Kathryn Jo Fehn
 Mississippi - Seletha Ann Jarreau
 Missouri - Susan C. Doerr
 Nevada - Leanna Johnson
 New Hampshire - Janice James
 New Jersey - Gidget Guenther
 New Mexico - Linda Jewell Delaney
 New York - Peggy Molitor
 North Carolina - Judith Ellen Steed
 North Dakota - Susan Marie Knudson
 Ohio - Charleen Heinisch
 Oklahoma - Angella Joyce Clement
 Oregon - Linda Susan Sargent
 Pennsylvania - Kathleen Felice
 Rhode Island - Tanya Thomasian
 South Carolina - Eleanor Susan Gordon
 Tennessee - Janet Elizabeth Boston
 Texas - Patsy Lou Quinn
 Utah - Carolynn Whitney
 Vermont - Jane Ann MacRae
 Virginia - Patricia A. Moldovan
 Washington - Debra Sue Dollemore
 West Virginia - Kathy Redosh
 Wisconsin - Janice Fazio
 Wyoming - Beverlee Mae Brown

Notes

Withdrawals
 - Constance Elaine Hanger was named Miss Indiana World 1970 and had arrived in Lake Tahoe for Miss World USA, however withdrew due to receiving a virus in which she had to go home.

Did not Compete

 - Constance Elaine Hanger (see Indiana under withdrawals)

Crossovers
Contestants who competed in other beauty pageants:

Miss USA
1964: : Royette Michelle Tarry (Top 15; as )
1968: : Sandra "Sandie" Anne Wolsfeld
1970: : Jacqueline Lee Jochims
1970:  : Margaret Aletha McAleer (Top 15)
1972:  : Eleanor Susan Gordan (Top 12)

Miss International
1971: : Jacqueline Lee Jochims (3rd Runner-Up; as )

References

External links
Miss World Official Website
Miss World America Official Website

1970 in the United States
World America
1970
1970 in Nevada